Joseph Antoine Ernest, Comte de Lipowski was a French general of Polish origin that served the Franco-Prussian War and was notable for being the main French commander of several battles of the war.

Biography

Early life and family
Ernest was born on 12 June 1843 in Strasbourg as the son of Pierre Nicolas Joseph Albert de Lipowski and Marguerite Sophie Laroche. He had two marriages with his first wife being Marie Eggerickx whom died in a few years and later remarried to Marianne Eastwood in 1876.

Military career
After graduating from the École spéciale militaire de Saint-Cyr, he became an officer but initially resigned this position due to several financial embarrassments but later came back but later came back when the Franco-Prussian War broke out and commanded the French forces at the battles of Châteaudun and Varize. For his service at Châteaudun, he was awarded the Legion of Honour, knight class. He was sidelined in the Paris Commune due to his friendship with Napoléon La Cécilia who was a communard and who had also served at Châteaudun.

Lipowski also participated in the Siege of Paris on 8 October 1870 as the main commander of 130 Francs-tireurs from Denonville as they attacked the 4th Squadron of the 16th Cavalry Regiment from Schleswig-Holstein and the 11th Cavalry Regiment from Bavaria that were stationed at Albis. The snipers fell back, taking 70 prisoners and 200 horses. In retaliation for this attack, known as the Ablis surprise, the Germans burned 120 houses, shot 6 residents and took 22 hostages to their headquarters in Le Mesnil-Saint-Denis who were finally released the next day.

Later Years
In his later years of military service, he would serve in the armies of Austria-Hungary and the Russian Empire simultaneously as in 1873, he was caught committing escroquerie as Lipowski had a large amount of unpaid bills but avoided prosecution in Switzerland due to being a French citizen but was removed from the records of the Legion due to this.

His service at Austria-Hungary isn't well known but it was documented that he briefly documented the 41st regiment of the Austro-Hungarian Army and during his final years, served as a commander of the Russian Empire until his death on 23 February 1904 in Paris.

References

Bibliography
 Alphonse Halter, Joseph Antoine Ernest Lipowski, in New Dictionary of Alsatian Biography, vol. 24, 

1843 births
1904 deaths
French military personnel of the Franco-Prussian War
French generals
Chevaliers of the Légion d'honneur
People of the Paris Commune
Military personnel from Strasbourg